Daniel Kellner (born April 16, 1976, in Livingston, New Jersey) is an American Olympic foil fencer. He has won gold and silver medals at the Pan American Games, and a gold medal at the Maccabiah Games.

Early life
Kellner was born in Livingston, New Jersey, and is Jewish.

Kellner attended the Pingry School, graduating in 1994.

Fencing career

College

Fencing foil for the Columbia Lions fencing team, as he attended Columbia University from which he graduated in 1998 with a degree in American history, Kellner was a 4-time All-American and 3-time All-Ivy League First Team Selection (1995-97-98).

He was the NCAA Fencer of the Year in 1998.

Quitting and comeback

After failing to make the 2000 Olympic team, Kellner retired from fencing. He returned to fencing three years later and won a gold medal at the 2003 Pan American Games, and his first national foil championship in 2004.

US Nationals

Kellner was formerly ranked No. 1 in men's foil in the U.S.

He won the foil competition at the U.S. fencing national championships in 2004.  Kellner rallied from a 0–6 and 1–7 deficit in his semifinal against Jed Dupree, countered with 7 straight touches, edging ahead to 8–7. The bout went to 14–14 before Kellner won it.  In the championship bout, Kellner beat Jonathan Tiomkin 15–6.

He finished 2nd in 1997, 1998, and 2000.

World Cups

He had podium finishes in World Cups for several seasons in a row.

Olympics

In the Olympics in Athens he came in 16th in foil, and the U.S. team came in 4th.

Kellner, seeded 26th, won his first bout, upsetting # 7 seed Cedric Gohy of Belgium, 15–12.  His next bout, in the round of 16, was against Richard Kruse of Great Britain.  In a very close match, in which he had been leading 14–12, Kellner lost 15–14.

Maccabiah Games

Kellner decided to skip the 2005 World Cup in Vancouver and the US nationals so he could compete in the 2005 Maccabiah Games in Israel.  His international ranking slipped from No. 11 to 12 as a result.  He led the U.S. delegation's march into the Ramat Gan stadium alongside legendary swimmers Mark Spitz and Lenny Krayzelburg.

Kellner won the silver medal at the 2005 Maccabiah Games, losing to Israel's Tomer Or 15–9.

Pan American Games

Kellner won a team silver medal at the 1999 Pan American Games in Canada.

He also won gold medals, both team and individual, at the 2003 Pan American Games.   The team trailed 40–30 entering the last match, which Kellner won 15–4, setting off a celebration.

Teammate Jon Tiomkin said: “There are no words to describe it.  No words at all.  That was absolutely incredible.  I've never seen a comeback like that in my life at such a high level competition and with such high stakes.”

US Team Captain

He was the captain of the U.S. men's foil National Team squad.

He is a 7-time world championship team member.

See also
List of select Jewish fencers

References

External links
US Olympic bio
Pan Am Games results
Jews in Sports bio

American male foil fencers
Jewish male foil fencers
1976 births
Living people
Columbia Lions fencers
Columbia College (New York) alumni
Olympic fencers of the United States
Fencers at the 2004 Summer Olympics
People from Livingston, New Jersey
Maccabiah Games medalists in fencing
Maccabiah Games silver medalists for the United States
Pingry School alumni
Pan American Games gold medalists for the United States
Pan American Games silver medalists for the United States
Competitors at the 2005 Maccabiah Games
Pan American Games medalists in fencing
Fencers at the 2003 Pan American Games
Medalists at the 2003 Pan American Games
21st-century American Jews